Dong-geun, also spelled Dong-keun, is a Korean masculine given name. Its meaning differs based on the hanja used to write each syllable of the name. There are 24 hanja with the reading "dong" and 18 hanja with the reading "geun" on the South Korean government's official list of hanja which may be registered for use in given names.

People with this name include:

Entertainers
Yoo Dong-geun (born 1956), South Korean actor
Yang Dong-geun (born 1979), South Korean actor
Shin Dong-geun (born 1993), stage name Peniel Shin, American-born South Korean rapper, member of BtoB

Sportspeople
Park Dong-keun (born 1941), South Korean taekwondo grandmaster
Lee Dong-keun (curler) (born 1979), South Korean curler
Lee Dong-geun (footballer, born 1981), South Korean footballer
Shin Dong-keun (born 1981), South Korean footballer
Yang Dong-geun (basketball) (born 1981), South Korean basketball player
Yu Dong-geun (born 1985), South Korean handball player
Lee Dong-geun (footballer, born 1988), South Korean footballer
Lee Dong-keun (badminton) (born 1990), South Korean badminton player

Others
Kang Tong-gun (1916–2004), one of South Korea's unconverted long-term prisoners who crossed over to North Korea in 2000
Shin Dong-kun (born 1961), South Korean dentist and parliamentarian

See also
List of Korean given names

References

Korean masculine given names